Allegedly is a direct-to-DVD special by stand-up comedian Kathy Griffin, and her fourth special overall. It was later aired on Bravo.

Summary
Griffin recounts run-ins with various A-list celebrities on VH1's red carpet, her USO show in Kuwait, Brooke Shields' mom and her antics at Shields' wedding, and a catty exchange with Barbara Walters on ABC's The View.

Track listing

Personnel

Technical and production
Tom Bull - supervising producer
Scott Butler - producer
Sandy Chanley - executive producer
Kathy Griffin - executive producer
Keith Truesdell - producer
Joshua Harman - film editor
Mark Hoffman - production design
Peter Margolis - assistant director
Marvin Bluth - tape operator
Thomas Geren - camera operator
Randy Gomez - camera operator
Marc Hunter - camera operator
Simon Miles - lighting designer
John Palacio Jr. - video operator
Kris Wilson - camera operator
Brad Zerbst - camera operator
Scott Freeman - assistant on-line editor
Stacy Brewster - production coordinator
Beau Brower - production associate
Sean Carter - production associate
Jaron Greenberg - assistant: Ms. Chanley
Byron Harris - utilities
Lea Kamer - production associate
Frank Linder - utilities
Peter Margolis - dga stage manager
John Pritchett - technical director
Doug Shaffer - production enthusiast

Visuals and imagery
Sachiko Tanaka - art direction
Cynthia Bachman Brown - hair stylist / makeup artist
Larry Elmore - house p.a. mixer
Scott Heflin - sound: A2
Larry Reed - sound mixer
Blaine Stewar - tpost-production audio

References

External links
Kathy Griffin's Official Website

Kathy Griffin albums
Stand-up comedy albums
2014 live albums
Direct-to-video specials